The Wuhan Gators are a professional arena football team based in Wuhan, Hubei. They are members of the China Arena Football League (CAFL). They were originally called the Shenzhen Naja and were based in Shenzhen, Guangdong. They were named after the species of cobra that lives in the region. Their home stadium was the Shenzhen Dayun Arena. In 2017, the Naja relocated to become the Wuhan Gators.

Seasons

References

External links
 China Arena Football League official website

 
China Arena Football League teams
American football teams established in 2016
2016 establishments in China
Sport in Shenzhen